'Brachypodium distachyon', the purple false brome, is a species of annual grass in the family Poaceae (true grasses). They have a self-supporting growth form and simple, broad leaves. Individuals can grow to 14 cm tall.

Sources

References 

hybridum
Flora of Malta